Ed McBroom or Edward McBroom may refer to:
 Ed McBroom (born May 30, 1981), member of the Michigan Legislature
 Edward McBroom (February 18, 1925 – October 2, 1990), member of the Illinois General Assembly